Sven Schwarz (born 3 December 1964) is a Dutch rower. He competed at the 1988 Summer Olympics and the 1992 Summer Olympics. He is Ralph Schwarz's brother and Bram Schwarz's father.

References

External links
 

1964 births
Living people
Dutch male rowers
Olympic rowers of the Netherlands
Rowers at the 1988 Summer Olympics
Rowers at the 1992 Summer Olympics
Sportspeople from Haarlem